James Brooklyn DeShong (November 30, 1909 – October 16, 1993) was an American professional baseball pitcher who appeared in 175 games in Major League Baseball (MLB) for the Philadelphia Athletics, New York Yankees (–) and Washington Senators (–).

DeShong's playing career lasted for 14 seasons (1928–1941). His MLB service saw him miss, by one year, two dynasties: the 1929–1931 Athletics and the 1936–1939 Yankees. However, he enjoyed a stellar campaign as a member of the 1936 Senators, posting an 18–10 won–lost record and finishing eighth in the American League in victories. His high win total in 1936 was accompanied by a mediocre 4.63 earned run average, and he permitted 255 hits (among them, 11 home runs) and 96 bases on balls in 223 innings pitched, with only 59 strikeouts.

Overall, in his 175 games, which included an even 100 starts, he compiled a 47–44 record and a 5.08 career ERA, permitting 968 hits and 432 walks, with 273 strikeouts, in 872 career innings pitched. He threw two shutouts and 44 complete games, and was credited with nine saves, then an unofficial statistic. On July 28, 1934, DeShong tossed a one-hitter against his former Philadelphia teammates, surrendering only a seventh-inning home run to Baseball Hall of Fame slugger Jimmie Foxx. He was a minor-league manager and a scout for the Athletics after retiring from the field.

Jimmie DeShong died at age 83 in Lower Paxton Township, Pennsylvania.

References

External links

 

1909 births
1993 deaths
Allentown Wings players
Baseball players from Harrisburg, Pennsylvania
Frederick Hustlers players
Harrisburg Senators players
Jersey City Skeeters players
Lancaster Red Roses players
Major League Baseball pitchers
Milwaukee Brewers (minor league) players
Minor league baseball managers
Newark Bears (IL) players
New York Yankees players
Philadelphia Athletics players
Philadelphia Athletics scouts
Sacramento Senators players
Washington Senators (1901–1960) players